Ricky Akdogan, better known as Ricky Rich, is a Swedish rapper. He lives in Västerås. Akdogan was born to ethnic Assyrian parents of the Syriac Orthodox faith. His family are Turkish-Syriacs who migrated to Sweden from Midyat in southeastern Turkey near the Syrian border.

Ricky Rich collaborated with Aram Mafia (stylized as ARAM Mafia) and made up of producers Peter Mrad and Marcus Turan, resulting in a great number of charting hits and songs in 2018 and 2019. Most notable was the single "Habibi" that became an international hit for the formation Ricky Rich & ARAM Mafia charting in Germany, Austria, Switzerland, as well as Sweden, and playing heavily on many other Scandinavian and European radio stations. On 12 April 2019, Ricky Rich and ARAM Mafia released the album Shhh on the label Spinnup containing many joint hits, notably the title song "Shhh" and the single "Richba". The 7-track EP peaked at number 3 on the Swedish Albums Chart and spent 21 weeks on the chart.

Ricky Rich followed up with his own 6-track solo EP Highs and Lows released on Warner Music Sweden, which peaked in its first week of release at number 7 on the Swedish Albums Chart. The album stayed for a total of 7 weeks in the chart.

Discography

Studio albums

EPs

Singles

Featured singles

Other charting songs

Discography: Ricky Rich & ARAM Mafia

EPs
(Credited jointly as Ricky Rich & ARAM Mafia)

Singles and other charting songs
(All songs credited jointly as Ricky Rich & ARAM Mafia)

Notes

References

Swedish people of Assyrian/Syriac descent
Living people
People from Västerås
Year of birth missing (living people)
Swedish rappers